Olo Max Brown (born 24 October 1967 in Apia, Samoa) played 56 tests at prop for the New Zealand All Blacks rugby team from 1992 to 1998, missing only two tests in his career. He suffered neck and back injuries which ended his rugby playing days, and retired to become an accountant.  By 2021, he had worked in private equity, including most recently being responsible for Investor Relations for the Punakaiki Fund.  

Os du Randt and Jason Leonard  regarded Brown as the best tighthead they ever scrummed against.

External links

1967 births
Living people
New Zealand international rugby union players
New Zealand rugby union players
Auckland rugby union players
Rugby union props
New Zealand accountants
New Zealand sportspeople of Samoan descent
Ponsonby RFC players
Sportspeople from Apia